Benard Michael Paul Mnyang'anga better known by his stage name Ben Pol, is a Tanzanian singer and songwriter from Dar es salaam, Tanzania.

Music career 
His previous release “Ningefanyaje”, featured Kenyan artist Avril and ranked #1 on Soundcity TV, Top 10 East and Africa Rox
Countdown. He published Sophia in 2015. His other well-known hits include “Unanichora” ft. Joh Makini”, “Jikubali”, “Pete”, “Maneno”, “Samboira” and “Nikikupata”. In 2015 Ben Pol participated in Coke Studio Africa S3 alongside 25 top artists including Yemi Alade, Sauti Sol and Flavour. Dubbed the “Tanzania R&B prodigy” he partnered with Kenyan rapper Wangechi. Ben Pol has collaborated with Amos and Josh, Nameless, Avril (singer), the King Kaka, Chidinma as well as Baraka Da Prince, Jux, Joh Makini, Gnako, Maua Sama and Fid Q in Tanzania. He is the winner of three Tanzania Music Awards in 2011–13, with two AFRIMA 2015 nominations and one in 2014.

Ben Pol collaborated with Mr Eazi on the song Phone released in 2017. In February 2017 Ben Pol was mentioned by MTV Base Africa through their platforms as one of the Artists to watch in the year 2017. Ben Pol did another collaboration with Darassa in the song called Muziki; the song was released in December 2016. Nominated in Afrimma Awards in the categories of Song of the year and Best collaboration in Africa- Muziki by Ben Pol with Darassa. Nominated at the EATV Awards for Best male artist and Song of the year "Moyo mashine".

Ambassador 
Ben Pol is one of the celebrity ambassadors for WildAid.

Awards and nominations

Tanzania Music Awards 

|-
| rowspan="1"|2011
|Nikikupata
|Best R&B Song
|
|-
|rowspan="1"|2012
|rowspan="1"|My Number One Fan 
|Best R&B Song
|
|-
|rowspan="5"|2013
|rowspan="5"|Ben Pol 
|Best R&B Song
|
|-
|Best Bongo Flava Act
|
|-
|Best Male Artist
|
|-
|Song Of The Year
|
|-
|Best Song Writer
|
|-
|rowspan="3"|2014
|rowspan="3"|Ben Pol
|Best R&B Song
|
|-
|Best Male Artist
|
|-
|Best Song Writer
|
|-
|rowspan="2"|2015
|rowspan="2"|Ben Pol
|Best R&B Song
|
|-
|Best Male Singer
|
|-

Under 30 Youth Awards 2013 

|-
| rowspan="1"|2013
|Ben Pol
|Best Male Vocalist Of The Year
|
|-

Africa Music Magazine Awards 2014 

|-
| rowspan="1"|2014
|Ben Pol
|Best East African Male Singer
|
|-

All Africa Music Awards Awards 2015 

|-
| rowspan="2"|2015
| rowspan="2"|Ben Pol
|Best African R&B & Soul
|
|-
|Most Promising Artiste in Africa
|
|-

EATV Awards 2016 

|-
| rowspan="2"|2016
| rowspan="2"|Ben Pol
|Best Male Artist  
|
|-
|Song Of The Year
|
|-

Discography

Singles

Best of ben pol (2017) album

Ben pol (2014) album

Maboma (2012) album

Collaborations

Movies

References

External links
Official Website

 Living people
 21st-century Tanzanian male singers
 People from Dar es Salaam
 1989 births
 Tanzanian Bongo Flava musicians
 Swahili-language singers